The Grădiştea gas field natural gas field in Grădiştea, Vâlcea County. It was discovered in 2002 and developed by Romgaz.  It began production in 2007 and produces natural gas and condensates. The total proven reserves of the Grădiştea gas field are around 170 billion cubic feet (4.8 km³), and production is slated to increase from 15 million cubic feet/day (0.425×105m³) in 2007 to 30 million cubic feet/day (0.85×105m³).

References

Natural gas fields in Romania